Agylla polysemata is a moth of the family Erebidae. It was described by William Schaus in 1899. It is found in southern Brazil.

References

Moths described in 1899
polysemata
Moths of South America